Matabele is a genus of beetles in the family Carabidae, containing the following species:

 Matabele arabica Mateu, 1986
 Matabele miranda Peringuey, 1896

References

Lebiinae
Carabidae genera